Pippa Garner (b. 1942 Evanston, Illinois and fka Philip Garner) is an artist, illustrator, industrial designer, and writer known for making parody forms of consumer products and custom bicycles and automobiles. Garner authored The Better Living Catalog and Utopia—or Bust! Products for the Perfect World and worked as an illustrator for the Los Angeles magazine and Car & Driver for many years. Garner has exhibited internationally at STARS gallery in Los Angeles, Jeffrey Stark gallery in New York, the Kunsthalle Zürich in Switzerland, and the Kunstverein Munich in Munich, amongst other institutions.

Work

Garner began her career in the 1970s in Los Angeles as a performance artist after serving in Vietnam as a combat artist. The artist was a U.S. Army Combat Artist in the Vietnam War and was drafted while working at an assembly line at a car plant. Garner was assigned to the 25th Infantry, the only division with a Combat Art Team (CAT). CAT tasked soldier and civilian artists with documenting the Vietnam War in the forms of sketches, illustrations, and paintings to be collected by the U.S. Army for (in their words) ‘the annals of military history –.' This is where Garner learned to draw and, eventually after a trip to Japan in which she purchased a camera, take photographs.

Garner went to the Automotive Design department at ArtCenter College of Design in Los Angeles when she was discharged. The artist was expelled after their first year. For a year-end project, she submitted, Un(tit)led (Man with Kar-Mann), circa 1969–72, it was a sculpture of a classic 1960s-style silver and white sedan accentuated by a male body from the waist down in the car's back. One human leg is lifted like a dog urinating. The work was last seen in the 1970s and only photographs of the work exist.

The artist modified a Chevrolet automobile to appear to be driving backwards while it moved forwards and vice-versa. Titled, Backwards Car, 1974, the artwork-like-invention was featured in Esquire in 1975. Garner's work has often been described as a "critique of car culture", reflecting on the US fascination with overbuilt, supersized machines. The work was noticed by San Francisco artists such as Ed Ruscha, Chris Burden, Nancy Reese, and the collective Ant Farm. Following the promotional feature of the artwork in Esquire, she began a long-term collaboration with some of these artists, especially Chip Lord of Ant Farm.

Later, she appeared on The Tonight Show Starring Johnny Carson wearing her infamous Half-Suit, 1982. Additional appearances included the Merv Griffin Show and several other talk shows where she showcased her satirical consumer product "inventions." Similar inventions and artworks were shown in publications such as Car & Driver, Rolling Stone, Arts & Architecture and Vogue.

In the 1980s, Pippa transitioned to a different gender as part of what she considered an "art project to create disorientation in my position in society, and sort of balk any possibility of ever falling into a stereotype again." In a recent interview musician and visual artist Hayden Dunham, Pippa has expressed these sentiments around gender and transition: "There was something that always seemed odd about being saddled with a gender, or being isolated by your gender. Because the advertising, consumerism, in the background in my life, was very much gender-oriented. There were things for women and things for men. It was all-out masculinity or all-out femininity, macho or made up. And if you didn’t feel that yourself, you felt uncomfortable."

Garner has been noted as a predecessor to the Kardashian beauty industrial complex as well as Paul Preciado’s Testo Junkie, from navigating the psych medical system to purchasing surgeries abroad on her transition, which jump started with black market hormones in the 1980s. Garner says in conversation with writer and artist Fiona Alison Duncan, who as working on the artist's narrative biography, “The concept of sex-change as a form of consumer technology began to intrigue me.”

Garner participated in Trappings, an artwork by Two Girls Working: Tiffany Ludwig and Renee Piechocki.  During her interview for the project, she described her transition as a kind of artistic expression. Pippa appeared on the show Monster Garage as a guest artist.

In 1997, Garner showed in Hello Again!, a "recycled art-focused" show which opened at the Oakland Museum and travelled throughout North America. The show, curated by Susan Subtle, featured Garner alongside Mildred Howard, Leo Sewell, Clayton Bailey, Claire Graham, Jan Yager, Remi Rubel, Mark Bulwinkle, and others.

In 2017, Garner had a solo show at Redling Fine Art, Los Angeles where she presented sculptures, drawings, and videos.

A selected retrospective was on view at JOAN gallery in Los Angeles in November and December 2021.

Immaculate Misconceptions
Garner is known for her Immaculate Misconceptions projects that she has been creating throughout her artistic practice. The series consists of hundreds of inventions, most of them involving repurposing household consumer products into gadgets or absurd devices. For example the ironic "Hurl-A-Burger" machine is a type of catapult designed to "promote cultural exchange" by launching fast food over international border walls.

Published works

 Philip Garner's Better Living Catalog: 62 Absolute Necessities for Contemporary Survival, 1982 by Putnam Publishing Group
 Utopia—or Bust! Products for the Perfect World, 1984 by Putnam Publishing Group.
 Garner's Gizmos & Gadgets, 1987 by Perigee Trade.

Exhibitions 

 Pippa Garner: Act Like You Know Me, co-curated by Fiona Alison Duncan, Maurin Dietrich, Daniel Baumann, and Otto Bonnen at  Kunstverein Munich (2022) and  Kunsthalle Zürich (2023)

Collections 
Garner's work is in the collection of the Audrain Auto Museum of Rhode Island, a selection of her photographs are held in the Contemporary Art Library archives.

See also

Ant Farm
Chip Lord

References

1942 births
Living people
Transgender artists
Transgender women
Transgender writers
American LGBT artists
American contemporary artists
Queer artists